The Süddeutsche Zeitung, published in Munich, Bavaria, is one of the largest daily newspapers in Germany. The tone of SZ is mainly described as centre-left, liberal,   social-liberal, progressive-liberal, and social-democrat.

History
On 6 October 1945, five months after the end of World War II in Germany, the SZ was the first newspaper to receive a license from the US military administration of Bavaria. The first issue was published the same evening, allegedly printed from the same (repurposed) presses that had printed Mein Kampf. The first article begins with:

Declines in ad sales in the early 2000s was so severe that the paper was on the brink of bankruptcy in October 2002. The Süddeutsche survived through a 150 million euro investment by a new shareholder, a regional newspaper chain called Südwestdeutsche Medien. Over a period of three years, the newspaper underwent a reduction in its staff, from 425 to 307, the closing of a regional edition in Düsseldorf, and the scrapping of a section devoted to news from Berlin.

In spring 2004, SZ launched the Süddeutsche Bibliothek. Each week, one of 50 famous novels of the 20th century was made available in hardcover at certain newsstands and in book shops. Later a series of 50 influential movies on DVD followed. In late 2004 the daily also launched a popular science magazine, SZ Wissen. In late 2005 a series of children's books continued this branch of special editions.

In early 2015, the newspaper received a 2.6-terabyte data set from an anonymous source. The dataset contained confidential information of a law firm offering the management of offshore companies. The newspaper in conjunction with the International Consortium of Investigative Journalists reviewed the data from the Panama Papers for over a year before publishing stories from it on 3 April 2016.

In the late 2017, the newspaper released snippets from a 1.4-terabyte data set to be known as the Paradise Papers containing about 13.4 million documents, throwing light on the financial offshore jurisdictions, whose workings are unveiled, including Bermuda, the HQ of the main company involved, Appleby, corporate services provider Estera, corporate registries in Caribbean and Singapore-based international trust and corporate services provider, Asiaciti Trust. It contains the names of more than 120,000 people and companies. The newspaper called in the International Consortium of Investigative Journalists to oversee the investigation. BBC Panorama and The Guardian are among the nearly 100 media groups investigating the papers. The leaked data covers seven decades, from 1950 to 2016.

In May 2018, the German Press Council opened an inquiry to determine whether a Süddeutsche Zeitung cartoon which depicted Israeli Prime Minister Benjamin Netanyahu was anti-Semitic; readers had complained that the image "reminded them of the anti-Semitic language of Nazi times." Süddeutsche Zeitung ended its decades-long collaboration with the cartoonist and apologized to readers, calling the cartoon a mistake.

Profile
In German politics, the term liberalism is different from that in the United States, and like other European regions, it is a concept that encompasses both centre-right and centre-left. Traditionally, Frankfurter Allgemeine Zeitung  represents the view of right-wing liberals, while Süddeutsche Zeitung represents the view of left-wing liberals. 

The paper, often abbreviated SZ, is read throughout Germany by 1.1 million readers daily and boasts a relatively high circulation abroad. The editorial stance of the newspaper is progressive-liberal and generally of a centre-left orientation, leading some to joke that the SZ is the only meaningful opposition in the state of Bavaria, which has been governed by the conservative Christian Social Union of Bavaria almost continuously since 1949. In the 2013 elections the paper was among the supporters of the SPD.

SZ is published in Nordisch format.

Contents

Sections
The national edition features four sections: Politics, Culture, Economy and Sports. Editions sold throughout Bavaria include statewide news. Editions sold in Munich and its surrounding counties add local news inserts.

The SZ is well known for its daily frontpage column Streiflicht (searchlight) of 72 lines, which is published anonymously.

Supplements
SZ Magazin (Friday), a magazine supplement
Wochenende (Saturday), featuring longer articles and short stories for the weekend.
TV listings (Tuesday) and an event guide (Thursday) are only included in the Bavarian edition.

Articles in English
Between 2004 and 2017, SZ published a weekly supplement containing articles in English from The New York Times.

Website
Sueddeutsche.de is the newspaper's website. It contains articles from the paper's own online staff, articles that originally appeared in the print version of the paper and agency reports. The paper's first incarnation on the web was launched on the paper's 50th anniversary.  It was called "SZonNet". The project was directed by Hella Schmitt of the SZ Text Archive (now DIZ - Documentation and Information Center Munich). Initially, it had no journalistic staff of its own, it simply used content from the print edition. Oliver Bantle, from SZ Science came up with ideas for publishing original science content online in 1996. The content went online in the fall of that year with Angelika Jung-Huettl as editor. Editorial responsibility lay with the then leader of SZ Science, Martin Urban. In the spring of 1998, travel-related content began to be published online. Wenke Hess originated the concept and implemented it as an editor.

Süddeutsche.de employs 25 journalists.

Circulation
During the third quarter of 1992 SZ had a circulation of 397,000 copies. The 1993 circulation of the paper was 304,499 copies. In the period of 1995-96 the paper had a circulation of 407,000 copies.

Its 2001 circulation was 436,000 copies and it was one of the top 100 European newspapers. In 2003 SZ had a circulation of 433,000 copies. In the fourth quarter of 2004, the paper sold an average of 441,955 copies. The circulation of the paper was 429,345 copies in the first quarter of 2006. During the first quarter of 2012 it had a circulation of 432,000 copies.

Editors-in-chief

 Werner Friedmann (1951–1960)
 Hermann Proebst (1960–1970)
 Hans Heigert (1970–1984)
 Dieter Schröder (1985–1995)
 Gernot Sittner (1989–2006)
 Hans Werner Kilz (1996–2010)
 Kurt Kister (2011–2020)
 Wolfgang Krach (since 2015)
 Judith Wittwer (since 2020)

Notable writers

Some of Germany's best-known journalists either work for the SZ or spent considerable parts of their careers working for the paper. Heribert Prantl, head of the national desk, is a lawyer by education, a former public prosecutor, and the most cited author of editorial commentaries in German press. Hans Leyendecker is one of Germany's best known investigative journalists. Leyendecker formerly worked for the magazine Der Spiegel, unveiling various political and economic scandals, such as the widespread illegal party financing during the 1980s, and that of the CDU in 1999. He also unveiled the smuggling of Russian plutonium into Germany with the help of the foreign intelligence service Bundesnachrichtendienst in 1994, bribery at arms deals, the German Visa Affair 2005 and corruption of the staff council at Volkswagen.  Another well-known journalist working for the SZ was Rudolph Chimelli, a political reporter who was working for the paper from 1 January 1957 to his death in 2016.

Martin E. Süskind also worked with the SZ and eventually became the editor of the Berliner Zeitung. Giovanni di Lorenzo, who was responsible for the SZ'''s full page documentary Seite 3 (Page 3) from 1994 to 1998, and who was later editor-in-chief of the Tagesspiegel, also worked for the paper. He is now editor-in-chief of the weekly German newspaper Die Zeit.

The investigative reporters Frederik Obermaier and Bastian Obermayer in 2016 initiated and coordinated the worldwide Panama Papers revelations.

See also

List of newspapers in Germany
 Media of Germany

References

Further reading
 Merrill, John C. and Harold A. Fisher. The world's great dailies: profiles of fifty newspapers'' (1980) pp. 298–304

External links
 

 
1945 establishments in Germany
Centre-left newspapers
Daily newspapers published in Germany
German-language newspapers
German news websites
Liberal media in Germany
Newspapers published in Munich
Paradise Papers
Newspapers established in 1945
Progressivism in Germany
Social liberalism